Cosmin Iosif Moți (born 3 December 1984) is a Romanian retired professional footballer who played as a central defender and currently the technical director of Ludogorets Razgrad.

Moți began his career at Universitatea Craiova before moving to Dinamo București in June 2005. He spent seven seasons with the club and won the 2005 Supercupa României, 2006–07 Liga I title and 2011–12 Cupa României. While at Dinamo, he also spent time on loan at Serie A club Siena.

In June 2012, Moți signed with Ludogorets, with whom he won seven consecutive Bulgarian league titles, as well as two Bulgarian Cups, and four Bulgarian Supercups. In May 2015, Ludogorets Arena's South Stand was officially renamed the Moți Stand in recognition of his unique contribution for Ludogorets's first ever participation in the group stage of Champions league.

In 2008, Moți won his first cap for Romania. He has represented the country at UEFA Euro 2008 and 2016.

Club career

Early years and Dinamo București
On 24 May 2003, Cosmin Moți made his debut for FC Universitatea Craiova in a 3–0 league loss against Ceahlăul Piatra Neamț. After he spent three seasons at FC Universitatea Craiova, Moți went to play for Dinamo București.

He made his competitive debut for Dinamo under coach Ioan Andone, playing the full 90 minutes in the 2005 Supercupa României which ended with a 3–2 victory against rival side Steaua București on 31 July. In the 2006–07 Liga I season, coach Mircea Rednic put Moți to form a couple in the central defense with Ștefan Radu, which helped Dinamo win the Liga I trophy, also managing to pass the group stage of the 2006–07 UEFA Cup, reaching the sixteenths-finals where the team was eliminated with 3–1 on aggregate by Benfica.

In June 2008, he had been linked with a move to Lazio to play alongside his former Dinamo teammate, Ștefan Radu who was already there. Lazio's president, Claudio Lotito, came to Romania to discuss the transfer with Dinamo's officials but the move fell through.

Siena (loan)
On 1 September 2008, Moți was surprisingly sent on loan to Siena, two days after he said he didn't want to leave his club unless Everton were interested. He made his Serie A debut on 25 October, coming on as a second-half substitute for Daniele Ficagna. Moți made his first start for Siena in a 1–1 home draw against Bologna on 16 November. On 2 February 2009, his loan was cancelled by Siena and he subsequently returned to Dinamo.

Ludogorets Razgrad
On 28 June 2012, Moți signed with Bulgarian club Ludogorets Razgrad. He made his debut on 18 July, in a 1–1 home draw against Dinamo Zagreb in the second qualifying round of the Champions League, coming on as a substitute for Svetoslav Dyakov. A month later, on 19 August, he made his A Group debut in a 3–1 home win over Beroe Stara Zagora. With his wholehearted attitude and commitment to the team, he quickly established himself as a first-team regular. Moți scored his first goal for Ludogorets on 4 November in a 4–0 home win against Etar 1924.

On 27 August 2014, Moți played as the goalkeeper for the final minutes in the Champions League play-off round against Steaua București after regular goalkeeper Vladislav Stoyanov was sent off for a tactical foul in the closing stages of extra time. Moți scored the first kick of the penalty shoot-out and went on to save two shots as Ludogorets advanced to the group stage for the first time in their history. Moți's heroics earned him cult status among Razgrad fans and he had one of the stadium's stands named after him. His performance in the memorable encounter also generated headlines in the main international sports media across Europe and the world, with some analyzers considering the match one of the most dramatic in the history of the Champions League. On 4 October 2018, Moți together with teammate Svetoslav Dyakov was in the starting line-up for Ludogorets in the 1–0 away loss against FC Zürich in the group stage of the UEFA Europa League and they jointly became the players with the most appearances for (a) Bulgarian team(s) in European club tournaments, alongside Hristo Yovov whose record of 66 matches they equaled. Moți has (as of 14 April 2020) made 76 appearances, trailing club mates Marcelinho who has 80 and Dyakov (with 79). Although he was no longer an undisputed starter during the 2019–20 season, in May 2020, Moți extended his contract with the team.

Moti announced his retirement on 15 May 2021, after Ludogorets won its 10th consecutive title.

International career
Cosmin Moți played 15 games at international level for Romania, making his debut on 6 February 2008 under coach Victor Pițurcă who sent him on the field in the 90+1 minute in order to replace Gabriel Tamas in a friendly which ended with a 1–0 loss against Israel. He played one game at the 2010 World Cup qualifiers, one at the Euro 2012 qualifiers, three at the 2018 World Cup qualifiers and two at the 2018–19 Nations League. Moți's last appearance for the national team was on 26 March 2019 in a 4–1 victory against Faroe Islands at the Euro 2020 qualifiers.

Moți was part of Romania's squads at Euro 2008 and Euro 2016 final tournaments without playing.

After retirement career
On 7 June 2021, Moti was announced as the new technical director of Ludogorets Razgrad.

Career statistics

Club

International

Honours
Dinamo București
Liga I (1): 2006–07
Cupa României (1): 2011–12
Supercupa României (1): 2005
Ludogorets Razgrad 
Bulgarian First League (9): 2012–13, 2013–14, 2014–15, 2015–16, 2016–17, 2017–18, 2018–19, 2019–20, 2020–21
Bulgarian Cup (1): 2013–14
Bulgarian Supercup (4): 2012, 2014, 2018, 2019

Individual
Ludogorets Fans' Player of the Year: 2014
Bulgarian A Group Defender of the Year: 2014
Bulgarian A Group Foreign Player of the Year: 2014

References

External links
 
 
 Profile on fcdinamo.ro

1984 births
Living people
Sportspeople from Reșița
Romanian footballers
Association football defenders
FC Dinamo București players
A.C.N. Siena 1904 players
FC U Craiova 1948 players
PFC Ludogorets Razgrad players
PFC Ludogorets Razgrad II players
Liga I players
Serie A players
First Professional Football League (Bulgaria) players
Romanian expatriate footballers
Expatriate footballers in Italy
Expatriate footballers in Bulgaria
Romania international footballers
UEFA Euro 2008 players
Romanian expatriate sportspeople in Italy
Romanian expatriate sportspeople in Bulgaria
UEFA Euro 2016 players
Outfield association footballers who played in goal